Parrhesia is the fifth studio album by American instrumental progressive metal band Animals as Leaders. It was released on March 25, 2022 by Sumerian Records.

Track listing

All tracks written by Animals as Leaders.

Personnel
Animals as Leaders
 Tosin Abasi – guitar
 Javier Reyes – guitar, mixing
 Matt Garstka – drums

Other Personnel
 Misha Mansoor - production, synth arrangement, bass
 Nick Morzov - mixing
 Francesco Camelli - drum recording
 Jens Bogren - mastering

References

2022 albums
Sumerian Records albums
Animals as Leaders albums
Instrumental rock albums